Princess Gwenevere and the Jewel Riders, also known outside of North America as Starla & the Jewel Riders (and sometimes spelled as the more traditionally Arthurian "Guinevere"), is an American comic fantasy-themed girl audiences-aimed animated television series produced by Bohbot Entertainment in association with Hong Ying Animation Company Limited. It was internationally syndicated by Bohbot on their Syndicated Amazin' Adventures block where it originally ran for two 13-episode seasons from 1995 until 1996. The show's plot follows the quest of the eponymous young title Princess Gwenevere of Avalon and her two fellow teenage Jewel Riders, Fallon and Tamara, to find the seven lost enchanted jewels so they can stop the evil sorceress Lady Kale from taking over the kingdom. In the second season, the Jewel Riders receive more powers to compete against the returning Kale and the mighty new enemy Morgana for more magical jewels in order to rescue their banished mentor Merlin and restore harmony in magic.

The series is in many ways similar to The Adventures of the Galaxy Rangers and both had the same creator and director, Robert Mandell, as well as some of its writers, notably Christopher Rowley. The series was initially planned as an adaptation of Dragonriders of Pern, came in the wake of Bohbot's earlier take on the Arthurian legend, King Arthur and the Knights of Justice, and shares similarities with the magical girl subgenre of anime and with some American cartoons. Although critics were divided on the show, it was a hit in France. It was later rebooted as the novel series Avalon: Web of Magic.

Plot

Premise
In the original version, the title character's name resembles that of King Arthur's wife, Queen Guinevere, but is rather her distant descendant and namesake, while other Arthurian characters include Merlin and the Lady of the Lake. The series is set in the legendary island of Avalon, here portrayed as a fairy tale-style utopia that keeps its magic in check through the seven Crown Jewels of the Kingdom, each representing an area of the realm. The story takes place a thousand years after the good wizard Merlin's initial victory over the evil queen Morgana. The eponymous Jewel Riders are young female champions of goodness and magical guardians of the city of New Camelot who, mentored by the ageless Merlin and aided by their magic animal friends, have been traditionally upholding the laws of the peaceful land and defending its people for generations. But when a new great menace looms over Avalon, and with their teacher Merlin suddenly gone, the current three Jewel Riders are tasked with recovering the mystical Enchanted Jewels that controlled and kept in check the dangerous Wild Magic.

Avalon's fate rests with the latest incarnation of the Jewel Riders: the 16-year-old Princess Gwenevere (Gwen) leading her friends Fallon and Tamara. Their jewels, besides their various unique powers, allow them to "ride" safely through the tunnels of a perilous dimension of the Wild Magic, as well as to communicate with their Special Friends ― the magic animals who each share a similar gemstone in their neck collars. The girls are often assisted by the Pack, an also teenage male trio of wolf-riding Knights of Avalon who wield the Forest Stones, and fight against Lady Kale, the depraved former princess of Avalon who has vowed to command all the magic and rule the kingdom no matter the consequences. An emphasis is set on the "power of friendship", which enables the Jewel Riders to overcome evil and to even ultimately befriend some of their would-be enemies. In the second season, the threat to Avalon is not over yet, and gets worse with an introduction of an even more dangerous adversary for the Jewel Riders to thwart. Instead of Crown Jewels, Gwen and her friends seek out another cache of magical gems while still struggling to keep off the forces of darkness and to contain the growing chaos in the magic.

First season 
The story is set up during the two-part pilot episode "Jewel Quest". Princess Gwenevere, the young daughter of the current rulers of Avalon, Queen Anya and King Jared, is being prepared by Merlin for the day when she will meet a bonded animal friend to share their own themed Enchanted Jewels with. Gwen is yet to be given the magic of the royal Sun Stone, while her best friends Tamara and Fallon already wield the magic of the Moon and Heart Stones respectively. Gwen needs to search for such an animal and become the new leader of the Jewel Riders, and later succeeds in getting her Special Friend in Sunstar the flying unicorn. Meanwhile, outlaw Lady Kale, a hateful and power-hungry sister of Anya, gets ahold of the mysterious Dark Stone and uses it to overpower Merlin, sending him into the deadly Wild Magic. The witch steals the Crown Jewels and plans to use their magic to take over Avalon and reign forever, but Merlin foils her by breaking their setting and sending them back to the lands from where they had come, scattering them wide across the kingdom and beyond. Unfortunately, once the Crown Jewels' bond is broken, magic is no longer stable and flows out of control, causing dangerous outbreaks until they are brought back together. Retrieving them is the only way the Riders can free Merlin from being lost in the limbo of Wild Magic and so their titular quest begins. Using the magic of the Enchanted Jewels and their friendship, the Jewel Riders must prevent the cruel Kale from gaining more power, reclaim the Crown Jewels, and save Merlin and all of Avalon.

The primary storyline tells of the Jewel Riders' adventures in their efforts to locate and secure each of the hidden Crown Jewels before Kale can get her hands on them or to win them back if she does. The seven Crown Jewels consist of the Jewel of the North Woods (in "Travel Trees Can't Dance"), the Rainbow Jewel found inside the Rainbow Falls (in "Song of the Rainbow"), the Jewel of the Burning Ice found in the Hall of Wizards at the Wizard's Peak in the snow-covered mountains (in "Wizard's Peak"), the Misty Rose Jewel found in the Misty Moors (in "For Whom the Bell Trolls"), the Desert Star Jewel of the Great Desert found in the magical realm of Faeryland (in "The Faery Princess"), the Jewel of the Dreamfields (in "Dreamfields"), and the Jewel of the Jungle found in the hidden lair of the legendary wizard Morgana (in "Revenge of the Dark Stone").

During the two-part dramatic finale of the first season (in "Revenge of the Dark Stone" and "Full Circle"), Kale succeeds in seizing control of the Jewel Keep at the Crystal Palace. Becoming seemingly invincible, the witch overthrows Anya, unleashes the dark magic onto Avalon, strips the Jewel Riders of their powers, and prepares to make herself a queen for eternity. Kale then seeks out Merlin to finish him off, but he uses his remaining powers to pull her into the Wild Magic and holds her there long enough for the girls to release the magic of the Crystal Palace, revealed as the greatest Enchanted Jewel in Avalon. Unaware of this, Kale attempts to absorb the powers of the gathered Crown Jewels and ends up destroyed by wild magic. The girls then discover that they have tuned the Crown Jewels to their personal jewels, enabling them to channel all the magic of Avalon. In doing so, however, they squandered a chance of solving the magic crisis for good, as well as a chance of freeing Merlin, who has given up his staff jewel so Kale could be defeated.

Second season 
The Jewel Riders realize that the Crown Jewels have given them a set of new 'Level Two' armor and magic seven times more powerful than before. They girls now have at their disposal far greater magic than they ever dreamed possible; they also find it difficult to use. Meanwhile, inside the Wild Magic, Lady Kale's Dark Stone is summoned toward a floating palace, where she re-materializes and meets her accidental rescuer, the legendary Morgana, creator and original wielder of the Dark Stone. Morgana had led the other ancient wizards against Merlin a millennium ago but failed and, having lost her jewel, has remained trapped in the Wild Magic ever since. United only by their mutual hatred for Merlin, the two grudgingly decide to team up as Morgana sends Kale back to Avalon in search for the other Wizard Jewels in a preparation for her own return. The Jewel Riders need to master their enhanced jewel powers while they continue their quest to bring Merlin home, especially since soon they confront Morgana and realize that they are facing a very dangerous new enemy.

The seven Wizard Jewels are just as hard to obtain as the Crown Jewels were, as they are scattered in magical places beyond Avalon. Through most of the season the Riders try to find the jewels before they fall into the hands of Morgana, who wants to use their magic to complete her conquest of the kingdom; at the same time, Lady Kale also seeks the Wizard Jewels for herself while supposedly working for/with Morgana. The seven Wizard Jewels consist of the Unicorn Jewel (in "Vale of the Unicorns"), the Jewel of Arden (in "Prince of the Forest"), the Garden Jewel (in "The Wizard of Gardenia"), the Jewel of the Sea (in "The Jewel of the Sea"), the Time Stone (in "Mystery Island"), and the Fortune Jewel (in "The Fortune Jewel"), not counting the Dark Stone itself. Princess Gwenevere meets a handsome, mysterious young man called Ian (a werewolf-like individual who later comes to her rescue her during the final battle), falling in love with him. Tamara gains a magical animal for herself, which turns out to be a strange striped unicorn named Shadowsong.

The deciding battle between the forces of light and dark ensues during the series' two-part conclusion (in "Lady of the Lake" and "The One Jewel"), set in the Heart of Avalon. There, Gwen is given the magic Staff of Avalon by the Lady of the Lake (the Spirit of Avalon), which she then uses to save her friends from peril. Once the world is rid of Kale once and for all, the final showdown against Morgana follows as the Riders and their friends band together to battle her in a test of skills and wits over the collected Wizard Jewels. Eventually, the princess fuses the Dark Stone with the Sun Stone and captures the ultimate One Jewel forged from all the Wizard Jewels, which the freed Merlin then uses to put an end to Morgana along with the ancient wizards' ghosts and the dark magic itself. The series ends with the Jewel Riders about to come back home with Merlin.

Characters 
The Jewel Riders consist of pretty and brave teenage girls Gwenevere/Starla, Fallon and Tamara. Each girl has different abilities along with their gemstones of common and unique powers that also allow them to communicate with their magic animals:
The adventurous and romantic Princess Gwenevere (voiced by Kerry Butler in the first season and Jean Louisa Kelly in the second season), the leading titular protagonist, is the daughter of Queen Anya and King Jared and the future queen of Avalon. She is the leader of the Jewel Riders, blonde and blue-eyed like her mother, wearing mostly shades of pink and wielding the royal Sun Stone with the great power of light and goodness. Her Special Friend is the unique winged unicorn named Sunstar (voiced by Deborah Allison).
The tomboyish and practical Fallon (voiced by Deborah Allison) is an athletic bodyguard of Princess Gwenevere. She is a dark-skinned and dark-haired expert warrior and the scout of the Jewel Riders with the main powers relating to movement and illusion, wearing mostly shades of purple and wielding the Moon Stone and riding the unicorn princess named Moondance (voiced by Barbara Jean Kearney).
The empathetic and musically-talented Tamara (voiced by Laura Dean) is the healer of the Jewel Riders, wearing mostly shades of green and able to communicate with all animals and wielding the Heart Stone. She is pink-haired with light green eyes and medium light skin. During the second season, she pairs with the otherworldly "zebracorn" named Shadowsong (voiced by Henry Mandell).

The Jewel Riders are aided, in a general absence of Merlin (voiced by Bob Kaliban) himself, by his talking owl familiar named Archimedes or just Archie (voiced by John Beach 'Voiceguy'). The girls are also sometimes assisted by the handsome and strong boys of the Pack, led by Gwen's aspiring boyfriend Drake (voiced by John Beach) who is supported by Josh (voiced by Bob Kaliban) and Max (voiced by Peter Fernandez). Other recurring characters include Gwen's parents Queen Anya (voiced by Corinne Orr) and King Jared, and the Travel Trees and Guardian the genie (all voiced by Bob Kaliban). Another major new character is Ian (voiced by Bob Kaliban), the powerfully built man-wolf prince of the Forest of Arden, who falls in love with Gwen and becomes her champion and second main romantic interest (besides Drake).

The series' antagonist is initially Gwen's beautiful and haughty aunt Lady Kale (voiced by Corinne Orr, who also voiced Kale's good sister Queen Anya).  Tall, raven-haired and wearing mostly crimson red, Kale is an "outlaw princess" who  has been banished by Merlin for her earlier plots against him and Anya and now uses magic for evil through the Dark Stone in her ruthless ambition to become the absolute ruler of Avalon. She aided by her animals: Grimm the dragon (voiced by Peter Fernandez) and a duo of small dragon-weasel creatures named Rufus and Twig (voiced by John Beach and Henry Mandell, respectively). The prime villain of the second season is Morgana (voiced by Deborah Allison), with a revived Kale being reduced to her very insubordinate sidekick.

Episodes

Season 1 (1995)

Season 2 (1996)

History

Development 
Princess Gwenevere and the Jewel Riders was produced by the New York-based studios New Frontier Entertainment and Enchanted Camelot Productions for Bohbot Productions (later BKN) in 1995. The series was produced by much of the team behind the late 1980s science fiction cartoon The Adventures of the Galaxy Rangers, including the creator, co-writer and main director of both shows, Robert Mandell, after a long development process. Despite a similar theme and title, there are no connections with King Arthur and the Knights of Justice, which was Bohbot Entertainment's other Arthurian-inspired cartoon series that was produced in 1992–1993. It was originally supposed to be a cartoon adaptation of the Dragonriders of Pern series of fantasy novels by Anne McCaffrey but eventually went in a different direction.

The series was renamed repeatedly in the course of its development, including to Enchanted Jewel Riders sometime in late 1994 or early 1995 and Princess Guinevere & Her Jewel Adventures in March 1995, before ultimately becoming Princess Gwenevere and the Jewel Riders (which was again retitled as Starla & the Jewel Riders for the export version). One of the several work-in-progress titles for the show was Enchanted Camelot, which was acquired as such in March 1994 by LIVE Entertainment (along with Skysurfer Strike Force and Highlander: The Animated Series). Enchanted Camelot had some major differences in its character design. The August 1994 draft script for the pilot episode of Enchanted Camelot ("Enchanted Quest", which would become "Jewel Quest") was different in many aspects. According to The Buffalo News, "the production team intended for the Jewel Riders to serve as positive role models for girls." Bohbot's press kit for the series described it as "classic story-telling," incorporating "strong themes of friendship, teamwork, responsibility and conflict resolution."

Each episode was constructed as an animated minimusical. The animation work on the series was done in Taipei, Taiwan by Hong Ying Animation Company Limited; one of the show's character designers was the future Emmy Award winner Rob Davies. The overall design was done by Jane Abbot, with Billy Zeats and Greg Autore serving as art directors. Enrico Casarosa was one of the storyboard artists. It was the first series scored by Louis Fagenson; though the French version's soundtrack was the work of Julie Zenatti. The show's CGI effects were created by Ian Tetrault in Autodesk 3ds Max and Adobe After Effects.

The actress for Gwenevere/Starla was changed for the second season because Kerry Butler had to go to Canada for the musical Beauty and the Beast. The series was not renewed for 1997, but there were originally rumors about a third season being planned for 1998.

The series' art director Greg Autore said about the making of the second season: "Bohbot wanted European distribution which required 26 [episodes]. So they made the next 13. They would have made more but were waiting to see how it succeeded. When the second set of episodes was turned on, the only two directions to start with were – 1) Search for wild magic jewels since the first set was all found 2) Use Morgana as the ultimate villainess instead of Lady Kale. Fortunately, director Robert Mandell was open to many of my suggestions. That second season had many episodes that grew from my concepts and a very rough storyline suggestion. Since the second season were not yet written and were rushed into production, this was where I had the most fun. Instead of just translating the characters and creating new fashions, I was free to create many new powers and adventures for the show. While I had input on many of the first episodes, I was now creating the basic storylines for entire episodes. Robert always had Morgana in the back of his head as a villainess he wanted to do. Now we could break out and expand the world of Avalon in different ways."

Broadcast 
The series was first broadcast in the United States in 1995–1996 on Bohbot Entertainment's "Amazin'! Adventures" block, had U.S. coverage of 80% and aired on 106 stations. Internationally, it was shown in more than 130 other countries by 2000. It was acquired by Fox Kids Europe in 2000. CITV in 1995 itself and Fox Kids UK when that first came out in 1996 aired it before the rest of Fox Kids Europe in 2000.

Release 
There have been four VHS releases in America by Family Home Entertainment in January 1996 covering only part of the first season and consisting of Jewel Quest (episodes "Jewel Quest Part 1" and "Jewel Quest Part 2"), Wizard's Peak ("Wizard's Peak" and "Travel Trees Can't Dance") and For Whom the Bell Trolls ("For Whom the Bell Trolls" and "The Faery Princess"), followed by Full Circle ("Revenge of the Dark Stone" and "Full Circle") in July 1996. Leading up to the release date, Hasbro and Toys 'R' Us offered an episode from the program on video for free with the pre-order purchase of a related toy. The UK (Carlton Video 1997), Serbian (Vidcom 1996, "Prizor" dub) and French (Warner Home Video 2000) VHS releases include some episodes from the second season.

In 2005, the rights for the DVD retail in the United States and Canada were given to Digiview Entertainment, which has reserved the right to release the show on DVD. They announced plans to release the first two volumes in 2006 and subsequent volumes over the course of the next year. However, the only DVD released by Digiview was Wizard's Peak, containing the first five episodes of the show and available in Wal-Mart stores. Though it says "Princess Gwenevere & the Jewel Riders" on the cover, the show on the DVD is the international version (Starla & the Jewel Riders); in the case of both the cover and the show itself, the Starla-style title fonts (similar to the title fonts in Gargoyles) are used in the logo, and the disc appears to be region-free. The complete first season was released on DVD in France in 2008 dubbed into French. The series was also released on DVD in Serbia in 2007 and 2008 with a Serbian dub. Pidax Film released the German dub together with the English original on DVD in 2021.

In 2008–2009, the series was available to be watched for free in a streaming media form on the Lycos Cinema service and later Kidlet.tv; while it was titled as Princess Gwenevere and the Jewel Riders, it was actually the Starla version. In 2009, the show was also made freely available for users of the Internet service SyncTV (available online from the browser for the American users and downloadable for watching for the others). In 2011, the Starla version became available for streaming through Netflix for the users in the United States, expanded to the entire first season in 2012. The first two episodes ("Jewel Quest") have been put on YouTube by 41 Entertainment, a new company founded by the producer Allan J. Bohbot. In 2018, most of the episodes have been released in high quality and wide aspect ratio through the subscription service Watch It Kid!. It was also made available on Apple TV, Amazon Prime Video, and (in Spanish) ZAZ TV.

Merchandise 
According to Robert Mandell, the show was originally commissioned by Hasbro through reverse toyetic to accompany their line of toys (albeit only in the form of vague outline and the creators developed the plot and the characters). However, according to Variety, Bohbot "took the Princess Gwenevere concept to Hasbro Toys, which after extensive market research, put itself enthusiastically behind the project, collaborating in equal partnership with Bohbot on the development of the property." A national "Watch and Win" contest in February 1996 offered viewers the opportunity to win Princess Gwenevere videos and toys if they mailed in the correct code words from the show. The Hasbro/Kenner toy line had two series of action figures for girls ages 4 and up. The first series contains Princess Gwenevere (Starla), Sun Power Gwenevere, Tamara, Fallon, Drake, Lady Kale, Sunstar, and Moondance; and the second series contains Deluxe Princess Gwenevere (Starla), Deluxe Tamara, and Deluxe Fallon. According to Time to Play, the action figures' sales "bombed". In the fall of 1996, Hasbro planned to reintroduce revamped versions of the figures as well as new characters from the animated series. The toys had a television advertising campaign featuring a 30-second commercial.

Other merchandise included a series of collectible trading cards released by the Upper Deck Company in 1996, a "play-a-sound" children's illustrated sound book by Nancy L. McGill based on the first two episodes and published by Publications International that same year, Panini Group collectible stickers, a makeup kit, Happy Meal and Long John Silver's premium toys, lunchboxes, clothing items, and such. There were unrealized plans to produce a video game adaptation and the series' theme song was included on Mastermix's TV SETS CD 14.

Legacy 
In 2001, author Rachel Roberts began writing her contemporary fantasy book series Avalon: Web of Magic loosely based on the show and borrowing various concepts and names (including even some of the episode titles), as well as lyrics from some of the songs used in Jewel Riders. As of 2012, the series consists of 12 novels, as well as the three-volume graphic novel adaptation, titled Avalon: The Warlock Diaries.

A film adaptation of Avalon: Web of Magic was announced in 2012, but was never released. An Avalon animated series project was revealed in 2017.

Natoo's jewel line Joyau Magique (Magic Jewel) was inspired by Jewel Riders, her favourite childhood cartoon.

Reception

Ratings
Princess Gwenevere and the Jewel Riders was reported to be "struggling with a 0.6 national Nielsen rating among girls 2–11" in 1995. Bohbot hoped heavy promotion of the merchandise products would raise awareness of the show. Nevertheless, it was the most popular of the first-run cartoon series in the 1995 edition of Bohbot's "Amazin' Adventures II" weekend syndicated package. Daily Herald reported it was "the number one syndicated television show in the U.S. among girls 6 to 11" in 1996. It was reported that Starla became "a huge hit" when it was shown in France. First broadcast there in April 1996, it reached the top of the channel France 3's ratings in children's time slots with a 77.6% market share average, proving "that action, knights and fantastic stories work very well with boys, too."

Critical reception
The reception by writers has been mixed. According to Video Librarian, "a cross between She-Ra: Princess of Power and the saccharine My Little Pony, the Princess Gwenevere and the Jewel Riders series is standard Saturday morning cartoon fodder." Scott Moore of The Buffalo News compared the "underwhelming" Princess Gwenevere to the "overhyped" Sailor Moon. Rob Bricken of Topless Robot ranked Princess Gwenevere fifth on his 2009 list of "most ridiculous" adaptations of Arthurian legend, commenting that shows like that "were clearly made to take advantage of a small, low-aiming school of girl-oriented action cartoons, but it ultimately lost out to a slightly more tolerable Japanese import." Bert Olton opined in Arthurian Legends on Film and Television that "Princess Gwenevere and the Jewel Riders combines all the worst elements of minimalist cartooning, modern commercialism and vacuous storytelling with a tiny portion of Arthurian legend." In The Middle Ages in Popular Culture: Medievalism and Genre, Clare Bradford and Rebecca Hutton described it as "a disappointing production that is markedly sexist and racist with only tenuous links to the Arthuriad." Kathleen Richter of Ms. called the show "so sexist and racist" for how it has "the powerful female figure demonized as evil and the main character blonde and blue-eyed."

On the other hand, France's Fun Radio included it among the 14 "probably the best" cartoons of the 1990s. Alan and Barbara Lupack opined in King Arthur in America that the show, "with its strong female heroine, is interesting in part because it is designed primarily for girls". Bustle'''s Lucia Peters wrote, "Princess Gwenevere and the Jewel Riders followed a pretty classic 'special kid and special friends have awesome powers and must defeat the forces of darkness' format. The fact that it met at the intersection of horses, sparkly things, and girl power, though, means that it holds a special place in many '90s kids' hearts." Some noted the show for its positive values. According to Billboard, "there are life lessons to be learned along the way, and the program in general promotes brains over brawn". Similarly, Keith Busby wrote in Arthurian Literature that "the series appeals to young girls and teaches them the values of friendship". Marshal Honorof of Tom's Guide described it as similar to the 1980s Dungeons & Dragons cartoon in being "a traditional swords-and-sorcery adventure with stand-alone episodes and an emphasis on making kids laugh rather than bogging them down with the dour intrigue or blood-soaked combat of most medieval fantasy stories." In 2018, Syfy's Brittany Vincent wrote that the show had been a "perfect fodder for young girls like me looking for strong women and heroes to imitate" and called it "a pleasant and kitschy relic of the past."

 See also Amethyst, Princess of GemworldLady Lovely LocksLoliRockStar vs. the Forces of EvilSteven UniverseTenko and the Guardians of the MagicW.I.T.C.H.WildfireWinx ClubWonder Woman and the Star RidersShe-Ra, Princess of Power

Notes

References

In-line

Other sources
 Enchanted Jewel Riders Show Bible.
 Full Production Credits at NYTimes.com.
  Jewel Riders at Super3 channel's website.
 Kevin J. Harty, King Arthur on Film: New Essays on Arthurian Cinema, 1999, p224.
 Barbara Tepa Lupack, Adapting the Arthurian Legends for Children: Essays on Arthurian Juvenalia'', 2004 ("Camelot on Camera: The Arthurian Legends and the Children's Films"), p281.

External links
  (archived)
 
 The Jewel Riders Archive

1990s toys
1990s American animated television series
1995 American television series debuts
1996 American television series endings
American children's animated adventure television series
American children's animated comedy television series
American children's animated fantasy television series
American children's animated musical television series
Animated musical groups
Television series based on Arthurian legend
Gwenevere
English-language television shows
Gwenevere
Fictional characters who use magic
Gwenevere
First-run syndicated television programs in the United States
ITV children's television shows
Magical girl television series
Television superheroes
Television about unicorns
Witchcraft in television
Wizards in television
Television series about princesses
Television shows based on fairy tales